HMS J3 (later HMAS J3) was a J-class submarine operated by the Royal Navy and the Royal Australian Navy.

Design and construction

They had a displacement of 1,210 tons surfaced, and 1,820 tons submerged. The propulsion system was built around three propeller shafts; the J-class were the only triple-screwed submarines ever built by the British. Propulsion came from three 12-cylinder diesel motors when on the surface, and electric motors when submerged.

Armament consisted of six 18 inch (450 mm) torpedo tubes (four forward, one on each beam), plus a 4-inch deck gun. Originally, the gun was mounted on a breastwork fitted forward of the conning tower, but the breastwork was later extended to the bow and merged into the hull for streamlining, and the gun was relocated to a platform fitted to the front of the conning tower. 44 personnel were aboard.

J3 was built for the Royal Navy by HM Dockyard at Pembroke Dock in Wales and launched on 4 December 1915.

Operational history
After the war, the British Admiralty decided that the best way to protect the Pacific region was with a force of submarines and cruisers. To this end, they offered the six surviving submarines of the J-class to the Royal Australian Navy as gifts. The flotilla reached Thursday Island on 29 June, and Sydney on 10 July. Because of the submarines' condition after the long voyage, they were immediately taken out of service for refits.

Apart from local exercises and a 1921 visit to Tasmania, the submarines saw little use, and by June 1922, the cost of maintaining the boats and deteriorating economic conditions saw the six submarines decommissioned and marked for disposal.

Fate
The submarine was paid off on 12 July 1922.

Citations

References

British J-class submarines
Ships built in Pembroke Dock
1915 ships
World War I submarines of the United Kingdom
Scuttled vessels of Australia
Port Phillip
Royal Navy ship names
Shipwrecks of Victoria (Australia)